Sofía Reca (born 31 March 1984) is an Argentine actress, singer and television presenter.

Biography 
Sofía Reca was born on 31 March 1984, in  Luján, Buenos Aires Province, Argentina. She is the oldest of six siblings, her father is one of the main owners of the electricity company Edesur and several gas companies, and former head for Latin America of the US investment bank Merrill Lynch and her mother is a housewife.

Personal life 
Reca married director, film producer and screenwriter Tomás Yankelevich on 20 December 2008. On 24 July 2010, she gave birth to the couple's first child, a boy, whom they called Inti Yankelevich. On 12 February 2018, she gave birth to the couple's second child, a girl, whom they called Mila Yankelevich. She is the daughter-in-law of the television producers, Cris Morena and Gustavo Yankelevich, and the sister-in-law of the late actress, Romina Yan.

Filmography

Television programs

Theater

Television

Discography

Albums 
 2010 — Upcoming debut album

Singles

References

External links 
 Official Website
 

1984 births
Actresses from Buenos Aires
21st-century Argentine women singers
Argentine pop singers
Argentine stage actresses
Argentine television actresses
Living people